Roland Bombardella (born 9 July 1957 in Dudelange) is a Luxembourgian soldier and retired sprinter.  As an athlete, Bombardella held the national record for the 100 metres and 200 metres, and competed in the  1976 Summer Olympics, where he reached the semi-finals of the 200 metres. He won the title of 'Luxembourgian Sportsman of the Year' in four consecutive years (1975 – 1978), a record that has not been equalled.  Since 1 January 2006, he has been Luxembourg's 'High Commissioner for National Protection'. He has two twin children Sasha Bombardella and Marc Bombardella..

References

External links

Luxembourgian male sprinters
Olympic athletes of Luxembourg
Athletes (track and field) at the 1976 Summer Olympics
Luxembourgian soldiers
1957 births
Living people
People from Dudelange